The Accountant in Bankruptcy (AiB) is the Scottish government agency responsible for administering the process of personal bankruptcy and corporate insolvency, administering the Debt Arrangement Scheme (DAS), and implementing, monitoring and reviewing government policy in these and related areas, for example protected trust deeds and diligence.

It reports to the Scottish Government's Minister for Business, Fair Work and Skills, who is Jamie Hepburn . The agency is based in Pennyburn Road, Kilwinning, Ayrshire.

See also
 Court of Session
 Diligence (Scots law)
 Reconstruction (law)
 Sequestration (law)
 Scheme of arrangement
 Institute of Chartered Accountants of Scotland  
 Insolvency Practitioners Association
 Debtors (Scotland) Act 1838

References

External links

Scots law
Executive agencies of the Scottish Government
Bankruptcy in Scotland
Organisations based in Edinburgh